{{DISPLAYTITLE:C25H38O8}}
The molecular formula C25H38O8 may refer to:

 Androsterone glucuronide, a major circulating and urinary metabolite of testosterone and dihydrotestosterone
 Etiocholanolone glucuronide, an endogenous, naturally occurring metabolite of testosterone